Serpentinicella is a Gram-positive, anaerobic, alkaliphilic and spore-forming genus of bacteria from the family of Clostridiaceae with one known species (Serpentinicella alkaliphila). Serpentinicella alkaliphila has been isolated from a hydrothermal vent from Prony Bay.

References

Clostridiaceae
Bacteria genera
Monotypic bacteria genera
Taxa described in 2016